Severe Cyclonic Storm Nisarga was the strongest tropical cyclone to strike the Indian state of Maharashtra in the month of June since 1891. It was also the first cyclone to impact Raigad & Mumbai since Phyan of 2009. The third depression and second named cyclone of the annual cyclone season, Nisarga originated as a depression in the Arabian Sea and moved generally northward. On 2 June, the India Meteorological Department (IMD) upgraded the system to a cyclonic storm, assigning the name Nisarga. Nisarga rapidly weakened once inland and dissipated on 4 June.

Nisarga was the second cyclone to strike the Indian subcontinent within two weeks time, after Cyclone Amphan, the first super cyclonic storm to have formed in the Bay of Bengal in the 21st century, devastated the state of West Bengal in May 2020. Before Nisarga, only two depressions had struck Maharashtra in the month of June, in 1948 and 1980 respectively.

Meteorological history

On 31 May, an area of low pressure developed over the Eastern Arabian Sea and remained as a well marked low-pressure area over the same region till the evening. It strengthened into a depression over east-central and south-east Arabian Sea in the early morning of 1 June. It later intensified into the Deep Depression on the same day. Around noon on 2 June, the deep depression intensified into a cyclonic storm and thereby receiving the name Nisarga. The name has been contributed by Bangladesh.

It later reached its peak intensity of 110 kmph which makes as a Severe Cyclonic Storm whereas one-minute mean windspeed were 140 kmph which makes as a category 1 tropical cyclone. At 12:30 IST (07:00 UTC) 3 June, Nisarga made landfall near the town of Alibag at peak intensity.

Preparations
On 1 June, Union Home Minister Amit Shah, held a preliminary review meeting with officials of National Disaster Management Authority, National Disaster Response Force (NDRF), India Meteorological Department and the Indian Coast Guard. On the same day, 33 teams of NDRF were deployed in the coastal region of both the state. Fishermen from Maharashtra were alerted to return from the sea.

Indian Prime Minister Narendra Modi, via a tweet on 2 June, updated that he spoke to Chief Minister of Maharashtra, Chief Minister of Gujarat and Administrator of Dadra and Nagar Haveli and Daman and Diu while assuring all possible support and assistance from the Central Government. As a precaution, 100,000 people were evacuated ahead of the storm.

Impact and aftermath
Nisarga caused 6 deaths and 16 injuries in the state. Over  of land were damaged. Chief Minister of Maharashtra Uddhav Thackeray announced an immediate aid of ₹400,000 (US$5,000) to the relatives of the deaths. Later, Thackeray announced another Rs1 billion (US$13.3 million) to Raigad district. The Government of Maharashtra put the total damage from Nisarga at Rs.60.48 billion (US$803 million), and the state required Rs11 billion (US$146 million) to recover from the damage caused by Nisarga.

The relief activity of the state government was panned for its effectiveness. The slowdown in providing relief was cited due to the peak moment COVID-19 in the state. A month later, 36,000 households electric supply yet to be restored, mainly due to pandemic followed by torrential monsoon activity early July. Damaged roads slowed down the process of loss evaluation of agricultural land. The  relief package was criticised for been meagre by the state's opposition leader Devendra Fadnavis.

Government of Maharashtra estimated about  aid for households affected. Slabs was decided for damage and materials lost and compensation was granted depending on the impact. Cyclone Nisarga destroyed 23 out of 25 houses in Udaywadi village.

Cyclone Nisarga produced heavy rainfall in the states of Maharashtra and Gujarat. 72.5 mm of rain was recorded in Marahashtra, with Jalna receiving the most rainfall (152mm).

See also

 Tropical cyclones in 2020
 Cyclone Phyan (2009)
 Cyclone Vayu (2019)
 Cyclone Amphan (2020)
 Cyclone Tauktae (2021)

References

External links 

 IMD Press Release 2 dated 1 June 2020

2020 disasters in India
2020 North Indian Ocean cyclone season
Severe cyclonic storms
Tropical cyclones in 2020